Meena is a South Asian children's television series created by UNICEF. It has been broadcast in English, Bengali, Hindi, Nepali, and Urdu languages and first aired on television in 1993 on Bangladesh Television. It has since been broadcast on state television in seven SAARC countries, including DD National in India. Ram Mohan, a famous Indian cartoonist, is the creator of the titular character Meena while UNICEF's Neill McKee was the series creator.

Objective 
The cartoon series is produced with the support of UNICEF as part of a program to raise awareness against various social inequalities in South Asian countries and to educate children. Awareness created through Meena cartoons includes stopping child marriages, encouraging the construction and use of hygienic toilets, sending girls to school, giving more importance to education than marriage of young girls, stopping dowry, equal nutrition and opportunities for boys and girls. Meena Day is celebrated on 24 September every year in South Asia, Africa and East Asia.

History 
From 1991 to 2000, the United Nations declared a decade for South Asian girls. UNICEF is responsible for its expansion. At that time, Bangladesh agreed with the Danish Government to provide financial assistance for the production of animated cartoons in South Asia. Meena started its journey in 1990 under the leadership of Neil McKee and Cole Dodge, UNICEF Bangladesh Communication Department. The name Meena is suggested by Shamsuddin Ahmed considering the people of all the countries in the South Asian region. Ram Mohan from Mumbai, India draws on each character's costume and appearance. The first episode of the Meena cartoon, 'Count Your Chickens", was made at the US animation studio Hanna Barbera in the Philippines. Later on, Meena cartoons were made at Ram Mohan Studios in Mumbai. At present, Meena cartoons are made in Bangladesh. Rachel Carnegie worked as a consultant for UNICEF's Meena project. Nuzhat Shahzadi and Dr. Mira Aghi of India were involved in the project.

Episodes 
There are 37 Meena episodes.

Characters 

 Meena: Main character.
 Raju: Meena's younger brother.
 Mithu: Mina's closest friend and her pet parrot.
 Rani: Meena-Raju's younger sister.
 Grandmother: Meena-Raju's old grandmother.
 Parents: Meena-Raju's parents.
 Lali: Meena's cow.
 Munmun: Meena's goat.
 Leder: The leading personality of the village.
 Shopkeeper: Feudal, oppressive, deceitful man. He has a shop in the market and his son has just passed medical from the city. He is the main villain in the cartoon series.
 Rita: A sister studying in the upper class of School, where Meena studies in. She was later married to the shopkeeper's son.
 Dipu: Meena's naughty friend. Mithu helps Dipu to become aware at different times.
 Teacher of the school: She helps Meena with various problems with time and wise advice.

There has also been the arrival of different characters in different series at different times.

 Aunt: Meena-Raju's father's elder sister. Bad-tempered, cruel woman.

Other activities 
UNICEF Bangladesh launched the UNICEF Meena Media Award in 2005 to create awareness among journalists for better reporting on children in the media. In 2012, UNICEF launched a live radio show featuring Meena, Mithu and Raju as presenters. In 2016, on the 70th anniversary of UNICEF, it launched the 'Meena Game'.

References

External links
 
 
 

UNICEF
Bangladeshi animated television series
Indian children's animated television series
Pakistani animated television series
Nepalese animated television series
1993 television series debuts